Boris Blank may refer to:
Boris Blank (musician) (born 1952), Swiss artist and musician, part of Yello
Boris Blank (ice hockey) (born 1978), German ice hockey player

See also
Blank (surname)